Pares, also known as beef pares, is a term for a serving of Filipino braised beef stew with garlic fried rice, and a bowl of clear soup. It is a popular food particularly associated with specialty roadside diner-style establishments known as Pares Houses (or paresan in Filipino, akin to tapsihan for tapsilog) that specialize in serving these type of meals. In recent years, it had also become a common dish served in small eateries called karinderya or carinderia that serve economical meals for local residents.

Informally, Pares can also refer to any dish that is cooked in the manner reminiscent of the "asado-style" (i.e. stewed in a sweet-soy sauce).

Etymology
The origin of the term Pares is credited to the carinderia Jonas established by Lolita Tiu and Roger Tiu in 1979 near the then named Calle Retiro (present-day N.S. Amoranto Street). The term literally means pairs in English and comes from the practice of "pairing" the beef ulam or dish with garlic fried rice and a light beef broth soup, forming a complete meal.

Description

Beef pares, or pares as it is commonly known, is a meal that consist of beef asado (beef stewed in a sweet-soy sauce), garlic fried rice and a bowl of beef broth soup. The soup may originate from the broth in which the meat is simmered in until tender before being seasoned with the sweet-soy sauce but it can also be prepared separately and be made with beef bouillon cubes instead. This soup is usually made and seasoned with onion, garlic, peppercorns, chives, and onion leeks. Some cooks also add bay leaves to this broth to improve the flavor.

Another variation of the dish, informally known as pares kariton ("pushcart pares") or pares kanto ("street corner pares") for being served on the roadside by mobile sidecar vendors, serves the beef and broth combined, usually with the broth slightly thickened by cornstarch. This variant is less sweeter and has less spices compared to the beef asado variant but is more savory due to the use of beef tendons (litid), bone marrow (utak ng buto), and fatty cuts of beef.

A garnish of chopped green onion and fried garlic mince is often added atop the dish before serving. Steamed rice is sometimes served instead of fried rice, depending on personal preference of the customer. Some Filipino restaurants also offer the option to serve the dish with an accompaniment of noodles instead of rice.

Another common way to eat pares is as beef pares mami (or simply pares mami). It combines pares with mami, the Filipino egg noodle soup. Its preparation is similar to pares kanto with the main difference being the addition of noodles instead of being eaten with rice. Its taste has been described as being similar to Vietnamese pho.

See also
Tapa
Philippine adobo
Batchoy

References

Beef dishes
Philippine rice dishes